Syzran is an airbase of the Russian Air Force located near Syzran, Samara Oblast, Russia.

The base is home to the 484th Training Helicopter Regiment with the Mil Mi-24 as part of the Prof. N.E. Zhukovsky and Iu.A. Gagarin Air Force Academy.

References

Russian Air Force bases